Shola (variant Sola) is a Yoruba given name. Notable persons with the name include:
Shola Ama (born 1979), British singer
Shola Ameobi (born 1981), Nigerian footballer
Shola Adewusi (born 1963), British actress
Shola Allyson (born 1970s), Nigerian singer
Sola Kosoko (born 1976), Nigerian film actress and director
Shola Lynch (born 1969), American filmmaker, artist and athlete
Shola Mos-Shogbamimu (born 1975), British-Nigerian lawyer, women's rights activist 
Sola Sobowale (born 1963), Nigerian film actress, screenwriter, director and producer
Shola Oyedele (born 1984), Nigerian footballer

In fiction:
 Shola Inkosi, a character in Marvel comics

Yoruba given names